Willie Taylor (born c. 1936) was a Canadian football player who played for the Hamilton Tiger-Cats and BC Lions. He won the Grey Cup with the Lions in 1964. He played college football at Florida A&M University and was drafted by the Green Bay Packers in the 1959 NFL draft (Round 6, #61).

References

1930s births
Living people
Players of American football from Tallahassee, Florida
American football guards
Florida A&M Rattlers football players
American players of Canadian football
Canadian football guards
BC Lions players
Hamilton Tiger Cubs players